Marlon Alex James (born 16 November 1976) is a retired Vincentian soccer player.

Career

Youth and early Caribbean career
James began his career in his native St. Vincent with the Youth Olympians, and played club soccer for Combined Stars FC and Newwill Hope International FC, eventually turning professional in 2000.

Professional
James began his professional career in Ireland with Bray Wanderers. He transferred to FC Tirsense in the Portuguese Second Division in 2001, and later played for Selangor MK Land FC in Malaysia, scoring 19 league goals in 2004 and 22 goals in 2005. He also played for Selangor FA in 2005 for Sultan Selangor Cup against Singapore FA.

James enjoyed a hugely successful period with Kedah FA in Malaysia between 2006 and 2008. On 8 September 2007, his two goals enabled Kedah FA to clinch the Malaysia Cup title in a 3–0 win over Perak FA at National Stadium Bukit Jalil, Kuala Lumpur, and also brought Kedah FA to the highest level in Malaysian football history. James received the 2006/2007 Most Valuable Foreign Player award in the 100Plus-F.A.M National Football Awards after his team won the treble – Malaysian FA Cup, Malaysian Super League, and Malaysia Cup. He scored a total of 40 goals in those 3 competitions. He also retained his Most Valuable Foreign Player award in the next season after helping Kedah FA to win another treble in the 2007/2008 season. 

After the Football Association of Malaysia barred foreign players from competing in the 2008 season of the Malaysia Super League, James moved to Canada, signing a two-year deal with the Vancouver Whitecaps in the USL First Division.

After residing in his homeland and resting from playing football for a year, he returned to Malaysia and joined the Malaysia Premier League club, ATM FA alongside Bruno Martelotto. Marlon helped ATM FA win the 2012 Malaysia Premier League, runners-up in the 2012 Malaysia Cup as well as win the Super League Golden Boot for the second time in 2013.

In May 2014, Marlon terminated his contract with ATM FA and subsequently retired from playing football professionally, due to persistent injuries which made him missed most of the ATM FA's 2014 season matches.

International
James has represented St. Vincent & Grenadines. Since 1995, the striker has earned 55 caps and scored 12 goals for his country, including four goals in 10 FIFA World Cup qualifying matches. His last international goal was scored against Canada in Montreal, Canada on 20 June 2008, when St. Vincent & Grenadines lost 4–1 in the qualifying stages for the 2010 FIFA World Cup in South Africa.

Honours

Kedah FA
 Malaysian Super League: 2006–07, 2007–08
 Malaysia Cup: 2007, 2008
 Malaysia FA Cup: 2007, 2008

ATM FA
 Malaysian Premier League: 2012
 Malaysian Cup: Runners up 2012

Individual
 Malaysian Super League Golden Boot: 2007–08, 2013
 100Plus-Football Association of Malaysia National Football Awards Most Valuable Foreign Players: 2006–07, 2007–08

References

External links

Vancouver Whitecaps bio

Malaysia League
RSSSF-Malaysia 2004
RSSSF-Malaysia 2005
 Video 1
 Video 2

1976 births
Living people
Saint Vincent and the Grenadines footballers
Saint Vincent and the Grenadines expatriate footballers
Expatriate association footballers in the Republic of Ireland
Saint Vincent and the Grenadines international footballers
Saint Vincent and the Grenadines expatriate sportspeople in Canada
Saint Vincent and the Grenadines expatriate sportspeople in Ireland
Saint Vincent and the Grenadines expatriate sportspeople in Malaysia
Saint Vincent and the Grenadines expatriate sportspeople in Portugal
1996 CONCACAF Gold Cup players
Expatriate footballers in Portugal
Expatriate footballers in Malaysia
Expatriate soccer players in Canada
Bray Wanderers F.C. players
Kedah Darul Aman F.C. players
ATM FA players
League of Ireland players
People from Kingstown
Vancouver Whitecaps (1986–2010) players
Vancouver Whitecaps Residency players
USL League Two players
USL First Division players
USSF Division 2 Professional League players
Association football forwards